Nina Frick Asenjo (November 19, 1884 – 1963) was a Chilean pianist and composer.

Chilean classical pianists
Male classical pianists
Chilean composers
1884 births
1963 deaths
20th-century classical pianists
Women classical pianists